Cloud Burst is a ten-part story within the Look and Read series of BBC Television programme for primary schools, aimed at improving children's literacy skills. The first episode of Cloud Burst was first broadcast on 24 September 1974; the last (of ten) episodes was first broadcast on 3 December 1974.

Plot
Whilst playing with a toy plane, Jenny Barber and her brother, Tim, meet a scientist, Ram Pandit, who is working on a secret invention. When Ram is kidnapped apparently by the mysterious Man on a Motor Bike who is working for rivals trying to get information on his work, it is up to the children to find them and stop his invention from falling into the wrong hands.

Cast
Richard Carpenter as Presenter
Jane Carr as Singer
Tina Heath as Jenny Barber
Anne Ridler as Mrs Green
Charles Collingwood as Wordy
Gerald Down -
Derek Griffiths as Singer
Nigel Rathbone as Tim Barber
Kenneth Watson as Mr Barber
Miles Anderson as Dick Turner
Renu Setna as Ram Pandit
Michael Sheard as Number Two
Bill Gavin as Sir Robert Blain

Episodes
 Out of Control
 Ram Pandit
 RAV 1
 The Gas Gun
 In the Hut
 The Secret
 To the Mill
 The Signal
 Escape
 Fire the Rockets

References

External links
BBC Cult tv programmes page: Cloud Burst
BBC programmes: Look and Read - Cloud Burst episode guide

BBC children's television shows
British television shows for schools
Look and Read
English-language television shows
Reading and literacy television series